Robert Recordon (born 18 July 1905, date of death unknown) was a Swiss racing cyclist. He rode in the 1929 Tour de France.

References

1905 births
Year of death missing
Swiss male cyclists
Place of birth missing